Clube de Futebol Oliveira do Douro is a Portuguese sports club from Oliveira do Douro, Vila Nova de Gaia.

The men's football team plays in the Elite Série 1 AF Porto. The team was previously promoted from this league to the 2006–07 Terceira Divisão, remaining on the then-fourth tier until their relegation in 2011. The team also participated in the Taça de Portugal during those years.

References

Football clubs in Portugal
Association football clubs established in 1932
1932 establishments in Portugal